Ramazanoğlu Cultural Center is a complex in the Karşıyaka quarter of the city of Adana. The centre is composed of a theatre hall, public library and an exhibition hall. It is located in the Seyhan neighborhood of the Yüreğir district, close to the east end of the Regulatör Bridge.

The Center
The center has been established on an area of 0.89 hectare. The theatre building has an area of 1400 meter square. Total cost to build the center was 11.3 million TL.

References

Theatres in Adana
Buildings and structures in Adana